The 1988–89 Maltese Premier League was the 9th season of the Maltese Premier League, and the 74th season of top-tier football in Malta. It was contested by 9 teams, and Sliema Wanderers F.C. won the championship.

League standings

Relegation tie-breaker
With Naxxar Lions, Hibernians, and Rabat Ajax all level on 12 points each, their head-to-head points were decisive. Rabat Ajax F.C. had the fewest points in those matches and were therefore immediately finished in 8th place and Relegated.

Results

References
Malta - List of final tables (RSSSF)

Maltese Premier League seasons
Malta
1988–89 in Maltese football